Nago–Torbole (Nach e Tùrbule in local dialect) is a comune (municipality) in Trentino in the northern Italian region Trentino-Alto Adige/Südtirol, located about  southwest of Trento on the north shore of Lake Garda.

The municipality of Nago–Torbole contains the frazioni (subdivisions, mainly villages and hamlets) Torbole (Turbel), Nago (Naag), and Tempesta. The villages cling to the limestone rocks on the extreme north-west slope of Monte Baldo; it lies close to the mouth of the river Sarca and its houses are set as an amphitheater around the small bay, in front of Monte Rocchetta and the Ledro Alps.
 
Nago–Torbole borders the following municipalities: Arco, Riva del Garda, Mori, Ledro, Brentonico, and Malcesine.

Torbole 

Nago 

Situated on the hills above Torbole sits Nago.  The parish church of Nago, San Vigilio, is located on the town's main road. The present building dates from the late 16th century, but the first church probably dates from the early Christian period. It is mentioned for the first time in 1203, in a document relating to a dispute between the people of Nago and the Bishop of Trento, Conrad II de Beseno. It is called "collegiate" in the document and its importance at the time must have been considerable.

History 

Venetian domination (1440–1510) is evident in the old harbor: a typical toll house placed on a lake-front wharf. Goethe, who stopped here in September 1786, described in his writings a longing and passionate image of this place. During Austrian domination (1810–1918), tourism grew during the Belle Époque.

This area was populated in prehistoric times and colonized during the Imperial Roman times; it formed a community with Nago, castle residence of the Counts d'Arco. In 1439 Torbole was involved in the Third Lombard War (1438), between the Duchy of Milan and the Republic of Venice. The latter dominated the eastern side of the lake (the Riviera). In order to gain supremacy on Lake Garda and help the Venetian condottiero Gattamelata, in freeing Brescia from the Milanese siege, the Venetians transported twenty-five boats and six galleys from the Adriatic Sea up the River Adige to the fluvial harbour of Mori. From here the boats were hauled further by oxen and manual labour until they could be launched into Lake Loppio, then further hauled along the slopes of Monte Baldo into Lake Garda at Torbole. This exploit cost 240 oxen and 15,000 ducats. In April 1440 the small Venetian fleet destroyed Visconti's fleet and conquered Riva del Garda.

Torbole, as early as the 15th century, was a stop for European travelers passing through on the Atesina road from Germany to Italy. Montaigne visited it in 1580. Goethe arrived here from Rovereto in the afternoon of 12 September 1786, four days after having crossed Brenner Pass. Goethe was 37 years old and upon seeing the blue expanse of Lake Garda and the silver olive-groves, he experienced for the first time the atmosphere and mild climate of the places extolled by the Classics, and he wrote that he had achieved happiness. The Brescian Cesare Arici, idyllic rural poet, exalted the "fishy Torbole". The painter Hans Lietzmann bought a large olive grove on the lake's shore (behind the Hotel Paradiso) and opened a school of nude art. The current tourist centre evolved in the second half of the last century from a village of fishermen, farmers and mountaineers, into a seasonal health-resort for European travellers, like the neighboring Riva and Arco.

Main sights 

The church of Sant'Andrea is first mentioned in a document dated 1175. In 1183 the Pope Lucius III assigned it, together with the surrounding olive grove, to the Cistercian Abbey of Saint Lorenzo in Trento, Italy. In 1497 some of the properties of the Church were given for the support of a priest who would look after the Torbole Community. In 1741 the curate of Torbole had been founded and in 1839 the church was officially consecrated. After being ravaged by French troops in 1703, the church was rebuilt in the Late Baroque style, but some architectural elements have been recovered, as testified by the dates sculptured on the base of the two rocky arches of the transept. The altar piece in the apse represents the martyrdom of Saint Andrea, by Giambettino Cignaroli. A painted vertical sundial can be seen on the church's lake facing wall and on the opposite side is a small cemetery.  The parish Saint Andrea church is divided into three naves and keeps a wooden chorus. Another artwork is the 18th-century canvas by Giambettino Cignaroli representing the Saint Andrea martyrdom.

A walk brings to the ruins of Penede castle, which was destroyed in the 18th century. It had been owned by the Arco earls, by the Castelbanco's and by the Republic of Venice.

In the Hairpin bends of the road that brings to Nago are the so-called Giant's pot (Italian: Marmitte dei Giganti) representing the evidence of erosive phenomena from the glacial era, which occurred when a wide glacier covered the territories.  Those so called Marmitte are sunken glacial era wells, set out by the stones and glacial, quick whirling, detritus coming down from the superior layers.

Cuisine 

Local cuisine is based on some typical elements of the Trentino simple plain fare such as polenta and game.

The broccoli di Torbole (Brassica oleracea var. botrytis) are a variety of cauliflower or broccoflower imported from Verona around the mid-18th century.  Inside the large cabbage family, broccoli di Torbole has become separate variety in its cultivar group.  After its seedling stage, it grows rapidly and without special care, but needs to be watered frequently. Maturation begins at the beginning of November and ends in April.  It has a small estimated harvest of 30,000 heads per year.

Sports 
The lake is a windsurfing, kiteboarding and sailing destination, with many sports centres available to visitors and championships running throughout the year.

Windsurf and Sailing 
The main winds on the north of Lake Garda are the Ora and the Peler. The Ora is a south wind, which starts at noon and blows until the early evening hours. The Pelér (also known under the name Vento (ital. for wind) is a north wind, which starts blowing in the second half of the night and continues until late morning. Those winds make Torbole an ideal place for sailing and windsurfing for both, beginners and advanced riders.

The sailing center (Circolo Vela Torbole) founded in 1964 counts 180 associates. It is one of the most important nationally known in Europe. Its regattas usually host international champions and national teams.

The windsurfing club (Circolo Surf Torbole) founded in 1979 and counts 250 associates, including the Olympic champion Alessandra Sensini. Among the national and international events hosted, three editions of the world championships are especially remembered (1988, 1992 and 2006).

References

External links

 Torbole Lake Garda
 www.gardatrentino.it

Cities and towns in Trentino-Alto Adige/Südtirol
Populated places on Lake Garda